Taichung is located in central Taiwan and is the second largest city in the island country.

Train service

Taichung Station is located on Jianguo Road (建國路).  There is a small square in the front of the station, and numerous bus companies have stations within a three-minute walk of the station. They provide local bus service along with long-distance bus services, many of which are to districts or townships not served by trains. The same pass card can be used for both trains and buses and there are discounts for students and senior citizens.

Taichung Station lies on the mountain line or formally Taichung Line, which splits from the coastal line from Changhua City in the south, to Zhunan, near Hsinchu, in the north. There are regular trains to Changhua from downtown Taichung where the traveller reaches the coastal line. Several train stations lie in different districts in Taichung.

The new High Speed Rail services Metropolitan Taichung via a station in Wuri District. There are regular City Bus services with several routes running between many places and the High Speed Rail Station. There are three or more THSR trains in either direction every hour and it takes under an hour to get to Taipei in the North or Kaohsiung in the South.

MRT Service

The Mass Rapid Transit (MRT) of Taichung is under construction and planning. The Green Line has been under construction since September 2009. The elevated section goes between Fengyuan Station and Daqing Station with service operations began on April 25, 2021.  The Green Line, meanwhile, also known as the Wuri-Wenxin-Beitun Line, will connect Dingjiushe to Xinwuri and was also completed for service on April 25, 2021.

BRT service

The BRT in Taichung has been planned for years. The company of Taichung BRT was established on 17 October 2012, and the construction of the Blue Line priority section lying on Taiwan Boulevard (臺灣大道) started 17 July 2013. The priority section of Blue Line, with half of the stations open, started operation on 28 July 2014, and all stations along the section will be open on 17 August 2014. Taking the BRT is for free for the first year.

The BRT service ended on 8 July 2015 because of the new policy announced on 30 March 2015. The BRT Lane was adjusted to ordinary Bus Lane, allowing its lane room to a few other routes which mainly operate along Taiwan Boulevard. From then on, the BRT Blue Line was no longer called BRT Blue Line but Bus Route 300 instead.

Taichung City Bus

There have been slightly more than 200 routes in the network of Taichung City Bus at the present in 2015.

The fares are calculated by mileage per ride. The basic fare is NT$20 for 10 km, and the extended fare is NT$2.431*(1+5% tax included) per km and round to the nearest integer.

Long distance bus service
Seven bus companies offer service from Taichung city to points outside the Taichung area. Some of the local bus companies have received permission to establish routes to e.g., Taipei.

Changhua Bus CompanyThrough its hub in Changhua City, just to the south of Taichung, Changhua Bus Company offers service to most of Changhua County as well as popular spots in Nantou County, including Nantou City, Caotun, and Puli.
Yuanlin Bus CompanyLike Changhua Bus Company, it is based in Changhua County, though in the town of Yuanlin, which is south of Changhua City. Many buses travel between downtown Taichung and its hub of Yuanlin. From there, it is possible to get buses to most of southern and western Changhua County as well as to Lugang on the coast.
U-Bus CompanyU-Bus has routes all over western Taiwan from Taipei to Kaohsiung. They offer service to those two cities, as well as Tainan City and the Taiwan Taoyuan International Airport. They offer service both from the Taichung Train Station and the Chaoma Bus Station.
Kuo-kuang Bus CompanyKuo-Kuang has a national reach with bus stations all over the country. The main Taichung station is located adjacent to Taichung's main train station. They also have stations at Chaoma and Shuinan. They offer service to many places, including Taipei, Kaohsiung, Tainan, Hsinchu, Keelung, Banciao, and Sun Moon Lake.
Dragon Bus CompanyDragon bus primarily offers to and from Taipei. Their main Taichung station is at Gancheng, but they offer stops all along Taichung Harbor Road to the expressway that leads to and from Taipei City.
Free Go (Flying Dog)Free Go (or Flying Dog as its Chinese name translates as) offers service primarily from Taichung City to Taipei City and the Taiwan Taoyuan International Airport. Their main Taichung station is at Gancheng, but they pick up and drop off passengers at locations including the Taichung Train Station, Chungshan Medical University, Chaoma and Shuinan.
Aloha Bus CompanyAloha maintains two station in Taichung City, Gancheng and Chaoma. Service is offered to Taipei and Kaohsiung. Transportation to other cities can be arranged via either of those two cities.
Ho-Hsin Bus CompanyHo-Hsin offers service to Taipei, Kaohsiung, and Zhongli.

iBike
Since July 2014, Taichung City started the Public Bicycles Renting Service, which is called iBike in Taichung. It belongs to the same system, YouBike, as Metropolitan Taipei (Taipei City and New Taipei City), Changhua County, Taoyuan City and Hsinchu City do. The service spots are continually added around downtown Taichung. There have been at least 306 service spots around all 29 districts in Taichung since 18 September 2018.

Sea Port

Port of Taichung, located on the coast of Taichung, is the second largest cargo facility on the island capable of handling container shipping. Despite being the second largest port on the island of Taiwan, there are no regular passenger ferry services available and the port is closed to unauthorized personnel.

Freeways and Expressways
National Highway No. 1, also known as the Sun Yat-Sen Freeway, passes through the western part of the city and has three interchanges in Taichung City. One is at Zhongqing Road (中清路), another at Taichung Harbor Road (中港路) and the southernmost at Wuquan West Road (五權西路).

Taichung-Changhua Expressway (中彰快速道路) is the main stretch of Provincial Highway No. 74 that runs from northwestern Taichung to the northern part of Changhua City (in Changhua County) just to the south of Taichung. At some points, it is just a few dozen meters east of the Sun Yat-Sen Freeway. While it does not connect directly to that highway, it does have an interchange with National Highway No. 3 in Taichung, where one can then access it in a couple of minutes.

Taichung-Nantou Expressway (中投公路) also known as Provincial Highway No. 63, runs from Taichung's Dali District to Nantou County. It can be accessed from downtown Taichung by driving on Wuquan South Road, where it becomes the Taichung-Nantou Expressway.  While there is no direct interchange with National Highway No. 3, one can get off in Wufeng District and, after about two minutes on surface roads, easily access the highway.

Taichung International Airport

Taichung International Airport is the third and newest international airport in Taiwan.

The Taichung Airport civilian terminal is located on the western corner of CCK Air Force Base, 20 kilometers (12 mi) from downtown Taichung City. The main road linking Taichung and the airport is Zhongqing Road (Provincial Route 10.) The airport is located within a kilometer (1,100 yd) of the Shalu (沙鹿) Exit on National Highway Number 3.

In 2002, the Ministry of Transportation and Communications began working on a plan to move air traffic from Taichung's Shuinan Airport to Qingquangang (CCK) Air Force base to convert CCK into an international airport, since CCK had longer runways to allow for larger aircraft. The airport opened in early 2004. The opening of The Taichung Airport did spark a spat of partisan controversy about being incomplete and safety concerns were raised.

Taichung's airport handles scheduled domestic flights between Taichung and Hualien, Penghu, Nangan, and Kinmen, as well as many international destinations.

See also
 Transportation in Taiwan

References

External links
Notenearly all of these sites are in Chinese

Train service

Long-distance bus service

Local bus service